Bullock Creek Public Schools is located in Central-South Midland County, Michigan. The school district has five schools: Floyd Elementary, Pine River Elementary, Bullock Creek Elementary, Bullock Creek Middle School, and Bullock Creek High School.

The mission of the Bullock Creek School District is as follows: "The Bullock Creek School District, in partnership with the community, provides a positive climate that supports excellence in teaching and learning, thereby enabling students to realize their full potential."

The 2015–2016 board of education is as follows:
President Mr. James Nemeth;
Vice-president Mr. Nelson Terburgh;
Treasurer Mr. Henry Mashue;
Secretary Mrs. Holly Miller;
Trustee Mr. Joel Beeck;  Trustee Ms. Jill Derry;
Trustee Mr. Scott Cain

The current superintendent is Mr. Shawn Hale; past superintendents have included Mr. Charles Schwedler, Dr. David Chapin and Mr. Tom Glisted (who coined "It's a Great Day to be a Lancer!")

The Bullock Creek Public Schools has a bi-monthly publication known as the Bullock Creek Community News, which serves the Bullock Creek Community.

High school
Bullock Creek High School, also known as B.C.H.S., is the only high school in the Bullock Creek Public School system. Its mascot is known as the "Lancer" with school colors being black and gold. It is located on 1420 S. Badour Road in Midland, Michigan. The current principal is Mr. Todd Gorsuch.

The longest-serving teacher at Bullock Creek High School and in the Bullock Creek School District was Mr. Charles Mielock, with 41 years.  He retired in 2010.

"The Lancer Link" was the school newspaper, which came out every other Friday. It was managed by students, and advised by Mrs. Shelly Discher.

The former BCHS Forensics team, coached by Jennifer Collison, was at one time the #5 team in Michigan out of 194 competing schools, as posted in 2006–2007.

Famous brothers Nathan and Andrew Mick graduated from Bullock Creek High school. Both went on to become doctors.

Sports
Bullock Creek High School offers eight male and female sports, which include:

Male: Football: [V] [JV], Golf: [V], Cross Country, Soccer (V), Basketball: [V] [JV], Wrestling: [V] [JV], Baseball: [V] [JV], Track & Field and Tennis.

Female: Tennis: [V], Basketball: [V] [JV], Cross Country, Volleyball: [V] [JV], Cheerleading [V] [JV], Softball: [V] [JV], Track & Field, and Soccer (V)(JV)

The athletic director for Bullock Creek sports is Mr. Ryan Badour.

Since 1999, Bullock Creek sports teams have had eight West Division champions, seven District, six Regional, five Quarterfinal champions, five Semi-Finalists, and one State Runner-up in Football.

During the 2012–13 and 2013–14 school years, the Bullock Creek Girl's Varsity Basketball team made two consecutive appearances in the MHSAA Final Four, before getting knocked out in the semi-final rounds each year.

In the 2019-2020 basketball season Bullock Creek Varsity boys has a tough a loss in overtime to Millington. Zac Yorke dominated the game and had 43 points. Legend has it the game still haunts the school to this day.

Bullock Creek High School has been a member of the Tri-Valley Conference since 1979.

References

External links
Bullock Creek High School Home Page
Bullock Creek School District
Bullock Creek High School Newspaper Online

School districts in Michigan
Midland, Michigan
Education in Midland County, Michigan